Kenny Clarke & Ernie Wilkins is an album by the Kenny Clarke-Ernie Wilkins Septet recorded in 1955 and first released on the Savoy label.

Reception

The Allmusic review by Scott Yanow stated: "Overall this is an excellent outing for all concerned". On All About Jazz, reviewer Marc Myers observed: "By 1955, Wilkins' charts had developed a knack for tightly wound swing and swagger, typically resulting in a polished shout chorus at the end. With Wilkins, every arrangement was an aerodynamic adventure, and he never relied on gimmicks or repeated phrases. His originals always sounded modern--the blues retrofitted with an automatic transmission and air conditioning ... For me, this is a perfect mid-1950s jazz album of seductive beauty crafted for a small group that thinks it's a big band".

Track listing
All compositions by Ernie Wilkins, except where indicated.
 "Pru's Bloose" (Ozzie Cadena) – 3:46
 "I Dig You the Most" – 6:53
 "Cute Tomato" – 10:58
 "Summer Evening" (Cadena) – 5:01
 "Oz - the Wizard" – 3:58
 "Now's the Time" (Charlie Parker) – 2:04
 "Plenty for Kenny" (Cadena) – 8:34

Personnel
Kenny Clarke – drums
Ernie Wilkins – alto saxophone, tenor saxophone, arranger
Eddie Bert – trombone
George Barrow – tenor saxophone, baritone saxophone
Cecil Payne – baritone saxophone
Hank Jones – piano
Wendell Marshall – bass

References

Savoy Records albums
Ernie Wilkins albums
Kenny Clarke albums
1955 albums
Albums produced by Ozzie Cadena
Albums recorded at Van Gelder Studio